Han Seung-hyeong (born November 10, 1993) is a South Korean football player. He plays for Nara Club.

Club statistics
Updated to 23 February 2018.

References

External links

Profile at Nara Club

1993 births
Living people
South Korean footballers
J2 League players
J3 League players
Matsumoto Yamaga FC players
Kataller Toyama players
Nara Club players
Association football forwards